Breteuil or Breteuil-sur-Noye (literally Breteuil on Noye) is a commune in the Oise department in northern France.

It is located in the Noye valley.

Law of Breteuil
The Duke of Normandy gave a charter to Breteuil guaranteeing it many freedoms. After the Norman conquest of England and later the Norman Conquest of Ireland, the "law of Breteuil" was granted to many towns in those countries.

Population
Its inhabitants are calles Brituliens.

See also
 Communes of the Oise department

References

Communes of Oise
Picardy